Louis Lozowick (1892 – 1973) (ukr: Луї Лозовик) was a Ukrainian-born American painter and printmaker. He is recognized as an Art Deco and Precisionist artist, and mainly produced streamline, urban-inspired monochromatic lithographs in a career that spanned 50 years.

Early life 
Lozowick was born in Ludvynivka (Makariv district), in the Kyiv Oblast of Ukraine (then Russian Empire) in 1892 to Abraham and Mary (Tafipolsky) Lozowick. His parents moved to Kyiv when he was young, and he attended Kyiv Art School before he immigrated to the USA, where he continued his studies at the National Academy of Design (New York) and Ohio State University. In America, Lozowick became fluent in English, in addition to his native Ukrainian, Russian, and Yiddish.

Career

From 1919 to 1924 Lozowick lived and traveled throughout Europe, spending most of his time in Paris, Berlin and Moscow. In the mid-1920s he started making his first lithographs. During this period he contributed an article to Broom which was very appreciative of Veshch-Gegenstand Objekt, by El Lissitzky and Ilya Ehrenburg.

  By 1926, when he joined the editorial board of the left-wing journal, New Masses, he was well-versed in current artistic developments in Europe, such as Constructivism and de Stijl. These hard-edged, linear styles, evident in a lithograph called "New York (Brooklyn Bridge)," suggest the possibility of an efficient reframing of the world, as did the political theories espoused in New Masses. A version of this lithograph was planned as a cover for New Masses that was never published.
Lozowick was highly interested in the development of the Russian avant-garde and even published a monograph on Russian Constructivism entitled Modern Russian Art.

In 1943 Lozowick moved to New Jersey where he continued to paint and make prints. The human condition remained a constant theme of his art, and an ongoing interest in nature appears more frequently in his later works.

The art critic for The New Yorker, Peter Schjeldahl, wrote a highly positive review of the exhibit "The Left Front: Radical Art in the 'Red Decade,' 1929-1940" at New York University's Grey Art Gallery in 2015 which included work by Lozowick. Schjeldahl wrote "…the aesthetic zest of sheer modernity leaks through in the work of such artists as the Ukraine-born Louis Lozowick, a still underrated virtuosic precisionist. His elegant lithograph "Construction" (1930), showing work on a New York street, with a cutaway view of stacked wooden supports underground, is formally inventive and feels celebratory."

In Aspects of American Printmaking, 1800-1950, Sinclair Hitchings wrote, "Are there such things as American Master Prints? Most certainly there are -- by Joseph Pennell, John Sloan, John Marin, George Bellows, Edward Hopper, Louis Lozowick, Martin Lewis, Rockwell Kent, Reginald March, Stuart Davis, Milton Avery, Raphael Soyer, Yaruo Kuniyoshi, Stow Wengenroth, and Ivan Albright, among others. The outpouring of prints in the United States after 1900 constituted a major artistic happening, one that will be duly chronicled in histories of printmaking in times to come."

Personal
Lozowick passed away in the Orange Memorial Hospital, in South Orange, New Jersey.

He married Adele Turner in 1933 and moved a few years later to South Orange, where their son Lee Lozowick was born on November 18, 1943.

See also
 Art Deco 
 Precisionism
 New Masses
 John Reed Club

References

Bibliography
Associated American Artists. (1992). Louis Lozowick : a centennial exhibition of paintings, drawings and prints: December 2–31, 1992. New York: author.
Flint, J.A. (1982). The prints of Louis Lozowick : a catalogue raisonné. New York: Hudson Hills Press.
Harnsberger, R.S. (1992). Ten precisionist artists : annotated bibliographies [Art Reference Collection no. 14]. Westport, CT: Greenwood Press.
Marquardt, Virginia H. (Ed.) (1997). Survivor from a Dead Age:  The Memoirs of Louis Lozowick. Washington, D.C.: Smithsonian Institution Press.

External links 
 Louis Lozowick (Russian/American, 1892-1973) on artnet
 Examples of Lozowick's work
 Columbus Museum of Art Web page on Lozowick's 1936 lithograph Lynching (click on picture for larger image)
 Louis Lozowick Papers At the Smithsonian's Archives of American Art
 Comrades in Art:  Louis Kozowick

1892 births
1973 deaths
Precisionism
20th-century American painters
20th-century American printmakers
American male painters
Male painters from the Russian Empire
Modern painters
Ukrainian Jews
Jewish socialists
Emigrants from the Russian Empire to the United States
American lithographers
Artists from New Jersey
National Academy of Design alumni
Ohio State University alumni
Federal Art Project artists
20th-century lithographers